Joseph I. Salas (December 28, 1905 – June 11, 1987) was an American featherweight professional boxer who competed in the 1920s. He won a silver medal in Boxing at the 1924 Summer Olympics, losing against future world champion Jackie Fields in the final bout. He was of Mexican American descent.

Amateur career
Salas won the National AAU Featherweight champion in 1924.

Olympic Games Results (1924)
 Defeated Agnew Burlie (Canada) PTS
 Defeated Heinz Levy (Netherlands) PTS
 Defeated Bruno Petrarca (Italy) DQ 2
 Defeated Jean Devergnies (Belgium) PTS
 Lost to Jackie Fields (United States) PTS

Professional career

As a professional, Salas accumulated a record of 28 wins, 6 losses, and 4 draws. His career was hampered by hand injuries. Upon retiring in 1931, he taught boxing at El Sereno Boys Club and served as a coach for the U.S. boxing team at the 1932 Olympics.

References

External links
 

Boxers from Los Angeles
Olympic boxers of the United States
Featherweight boxers
Olympic silver medalists for the United States in boxing
Boxers at the 1924 Summer Olympics
1905 births
1987 deaths
Place of birth missing
American male boxers
American boxers of Mexican descent
Medalists at the 1924 Summer Olympics